Kwak Hee-sung  is a South Korean actor and musician. He made his acting debut in 2012 with the cable series  Korean Peninsula. Kwak is also the vocalist and bassist of the rock band E.D.E.N. ("Every Day Every Night").

Filmography

Film

Television series

Discography

References

External links
  
 
 

South Korean rock musicians
South Korean male television actors
South Korean male models
Living people
1990 births